Joseph William Sacco (born February 4, 1969) is an American former National Hockey League player and currently an assistant coach for the Boston Bruins. His younger brother David Sacco also played in the NHL.

Career

Playing career
As a youth, Sacco played in the 1982 Quebec International Pee-Wee Hockey Tournament with the Boston Braves minor ice hockey team.  

Drafted in the 1987 NHL Entry Draft by the Toronto Maple Leafs, Sacco played for Boston University before joining the Leafs. Sacco also played for the Mighty Ducks of Anaheim, New York Islanders, Washington Capitals, and Philadelphia Flyers. In 738 NHL games, he had 94 goals and 119 assists.

International play
Played for USA in:
1989 World Ice Hockey Championships
1990 World Ice Hockey Championships
1991 World Ice Hockey Championships
1992 Winter Olympics
1992 World Ice Hockey Championships
1994 World Ice Hockey Championships
1996 World Ice Hockey Championships
2002 World Ice Hockey Championships

Coaching career
In the 2005–06 season, two years into retirement from playing, Sacco was hired as an assistant coach for the Lowell Lock Monsters, affiliate of the Colorado Avalanche. On May 7, 2007, after two years as an assistant, Sacco was named head coach of the Colorado Avalanche's new AHL franchise, the Lake Erie Monsters. Sacco then led the Monsters for the next two seasons and while recording somewhat unimpressive season's numbers with limited resources was credited with helping development of younger players to the NHL.

On June 4, 2009, a day after Avalanche head coach Tony Granato was fired, Sacco was promoted and later introduced as the new head coach of the Colorado Avalanche for the 2009–10 season, a job former Avs great Patrick Roy turned down days prior. After being projected finishing 15th in the Western Conference by most hockey pundits, Sacco coached the Avalanche to the 2010 Stanley Cup Playoffs posting a record of 43–30–9 in his rookie year of coaching in the NHL.  His team would end up being eliminated in the first round after six games by the San Jose Sharks. On April 28, 2010, Sacco was named a finalist for the Jack Adams Award for NHL coach of the year alongside Dave Tippett of the Phoenix Coyotes and Barry Trotz of the Nashville Predators.

Following the 2012–13 season, his fourth year at the helm, finishing last in the Western Conference and out of the playoffs for a third consecutive year, Sacco was relieved of his duties on April 28, 2013. It brought an end to his eight-year association with the Avalanche.

On July 2, 2013, the Buffalo Sabres hired Sacco as an assistant coach.

On July 24, 2014, the Boston Bruins hired Sacco as their assistant coach.

Career statistics

Regular season and playoffs

International

Coaching record

NHL

AHL

See also
List of NHL head coaches

References

External links

1969 births
Living people
American expatriate ice hockey players in Canada
American ice hockey coaches
American men's ice hockey right wingers
American people of Italian descent
Boston Bruins coaches
Boston University Terriers men's ice hockey players
Buffalo Sabres coaches
Colorado Avalanche coaches
Ice hockey coaches from Massachusetts
Ice hockey players at the 1992 Winter Olympics
Mighty Ducks of Anaheim players
New York Islanders players
Newmarket Saints players
Olympic ice hockey players of the United States
Sportspeople from Medford, Massachusetts
Philadelphia Flyers players
Philadelphia Phantoms players
St. John's Maple Leafs players
Toronto Maple Leafs draft picks
Toronto Maple Leafs players
Washington Capitals players
Ice hockey players from Massachusetts